Chaldean people may refer to:

 Ancient Chaldean people, ancient Semitic people in southern Mesopotamia
 Modern Chaldean people, modern self-identification of Chaldean Catholics

See also
 Chaldean (disambiguation)